Peter Schneider (born 21 April 1940 in Lübeck) is a German writer.

Life
Schneider is the son of a conductor and composer. He spent his early childhood in Königsberg and Saxony; from 1945 to 1950 he lived in Grainau near Garmisch-Partenkirchen, and from 1950 in Freiburg im Breisgau. After gaining his Abitur in 1959 he studied German, history, and philosophy at the universities of Freiburg and Munich. In 1962 he continued his studies at the Free University of Berlin. In the federal election campaign of 1965 he worked together with a number of well-known writers in the Wahlkampfkontor (electoral office) of the SPD.

During the 1960s Schneider experienced a political radicalisation that led him to become one of the spokespersons and organisers of the Berlin German student movement. In 1967 he was involved in the preparation of the so-called "Springer-Tribunal". He was a member of a group aiming to found a proletarian political party and rouse the working class. For this reason Schneider worked temporarily as an unskilled worker in one of the Bosch factories. Later he taught in a private school and did freelance work in broadcasting. In 1972 he received his degree, but in 1973 the education authorities in Berlin refused to appoint him as a trainee teacher on account of his political activity. That decision was overturned by a court in Berlin in 1976.

Having in the meantime established himself as a writer, Schneider gave up the idea of teaching. His novel Lenz, published in 1973, had become a cult text for the German left, capturing the feelings of those disappointed by the failure of their utopian revolt. Since then, Schneider has written  novels, short stories, and film scripts that often deal with the fate of members of his generation. Other works deal with the situation of Berlin before and after German reunification. Schneider is also a major essayist.

Schneider has frequently held posts as visiting professor or writer in residence at universities in the United States, including Stanford, Harvard and Princeton. Since 2001 he has been the Roth Distinguished Writer-in-Residence at Georgetown University. He lives in Berlin.

Schneider is a member of the German PEN Club. He is a recipient of a Villa Massimo scholarship (1979) and the Förderpreis für Literatur des Kulturkreises of the Bundesverband der Deutschen Industrie (1983).

Works in English
 The Wall Jumper, New York 1984
 The German Comedy, New York 1990
 Couplings, New York 1996
 Eduard's Homecoming, New York 2000
 Berlin Now, Farrar, Straus and Giroux 2014

Secondary literature
 Alois Prinz: Der poetische Mensch im Schatten der Utopie, Würzburg 1990
 Colin Riordan (ed.): Peter Schneider, Cardiff 1995
 Markus Meik: Peter Schneiders Erzählung "Lenz", Siegen  1997
 Elizabeth Snyder Hook: Family secrets and the contemporary German novel, Rochester, NY [u. a.] 2001
 Gundula M. Sharman: Twentieth century reworkings of German literature, Rochester, NY [u. a.] 2002

Filmography
, directed by Reinhard Hauff (1982, based on Der Mauerspringer)
Rua Alguem 5555: My Father, directed by Egidio Eronico (2003, based on Vati)
Screenwriter
Abgründe (Anthology film, segment: Robert, dir. Peter Lilienthal, 1967, TV film)
Knife in the Head (dir. Reinhard Hauff, 1978)
Pestalozzi's Mountain (dir. Peter von Gunten, 1989)
The Promise (dir. Margarethe von Trotta, 1995)

References

External links

 Internetpräsenz von Peter Schneider
 
 Biography
 Review of The Wall Jumper by Ian McEwan

1940 births
Living people
20th-century German novelists
21st-century German novelists
Georgetown University faculty
German male novelists
People from Garmisch-Partenkirchen (district)
20th-century German male writers
21st-century German male writers